Rund is a surname. Notable people with the surname include:

 Cathleen Rund (born 1977), German swimmer
 Hanno Rund (1925–1993), German mathematician
 Thorsten Rund (born 1976), German road and track cyclist

See also
 Rand (surname)
 Ruud